The B 81500 (often called BGC) is a class of bi-mode multiple units built by Bombardier for SNCF and used on the TER network in France. They are primarily used on suburban and regional services. It has been in operation since 2005 on the TER Aquitaine, TER Bourgogne, TER Centre, TER Champagne-Ardenne, TER Languedoc-Roussillon, TER Limousin, TER Midi-Pyrénées, TER PACA, TER Pays de la Loire, and TER Rhône-Alpes lines.

The Class B 81500 trains are composed of four or five cars, and have a capacity of around 300 passengers. They feature air-conditioning, comfortable seating, and are equipped with power outlets and onboard passenger information systems. They are designed to be accessible to passengers with reduced mobility, with features such as wheelchair ramps and audio announcements.

The trains are capable of operating on diesel power as well as a 1.5 kV DC electricity supply, and have a top speed of 160 km/h (99 mph). They have a modern and aerodynamic design, which helps to reduce energy consumption and improve their performance.

The class B 81500 trains are known for their reliability, comfort and energy efficiency. They are widely used in the french railway network and have been a key element in the modernization of the suburban and regional services in France.

Gallery 

B 81500
Bombardier Transportation multiple units
Hybrid multiple units of France
1500 V DC multiple units of France